The Kuala Krai railway station is a Malaysian train station stationed at and named after the town of Kuala Krai, Kelantan. It is the biggest railway station in Kelantan state.

The Kuala Krai Railway Station is on Keretapi Tanah Melayu (KTM)'s East Coast Line that runs from Tumpat and Wakaf Bharu (close to Kota Bharu) right through the interior of the country to Gemas on the west of the peninsula, where it joins the main West Coast Line from Singapore to Kuala Lumpur. The opening of the railway line made a significant difference to the remote interior of the state of Kelantan.

Train services
 Ekspres Rakyat Timuran 26/27 Tumpat–JB Sentral
 Shuttle Timur 51/52/57/60 Tumpat–Gua Musang
 Shuttle Timur 55/56 Tumpat–Dabong

See also

 Rail transport in Malaysia

External links
Kuala Lumpur MRT & KTM Intercity Integrations

KTM East Coast Line stations
Kuala Krai District
Railway stations in Kelantan